WEGA – Die Spezialeinheit der Polizei   is an Austrian television series.

See also
List of Austrian television series

Austrian television series
Austrian crime television series
2011 Austrian television series debuts
2011 Austrian television series endings
2010s Austrian television series
German-language television shows